A statue of Christopher Columbus is installed in Chelsea, Massachusetts, United States.

References

External links
 

Monuments and memorials in Massachusetts
Outdoor sculptures in Massachusetts
Sculptures of men in Massachusetts
Statues in Massachusetts
Chelsea, Massachusetts